Ferenc Nezvál (7 February 1909 – 26 November 1987) was a Hungarian politician and jurist, who served as Minister of Justice between 1957 and 1966.

References
 Magyar Életrajzi Lexikon

1909 births
1987 deaths
Hungarian communists
Justice ministers of Hungary